The Rhode Island Rams men's soccer team is an intercollegiate varsity sports team of the University of Rhode Island. The team competes in the Atlantic 10 Conference.

Postseason results

A10 Tournament results

NCAA tournament results 

Rhode Island has appeared in 12 NCAA Tournaments. Their best performance was reaching the quarterfinals in 1979. Their most recent appearance was in 2006.

Notable alumni
 Geoff Cameron
 Danleigh Borman
 Paulo Dos Santos
 Simon Gatti
 Andy Williams
 Ross Smith
 Łukasz Tumicz
 Nicholas McCreath
 Dan McCrudden
 Sasha Gotsmanov
 Winston Griffiths
 Mick McDermott
Michael Tanke

References

External links
 

 
Soccer clubs in Rhode Island
1961 establishments in Rhode Island
Association football clubs established in 1961